Taretiita Baraniko Tabaroua (born ) is a I-Kiribati male weightlifter, competing in the 77 kg category and representing Kiribati at international competitions. He won the silver medal at the 2016 Oceania Weightlifting Championships, lifting a total of 290 kg. He participated at the 2014 Commonwealth Games in the 77 kg event.

Major competitions

References

External links

1994 births
Living people
I-Kiribati male weightlifters
Place of birth missing (living people)
Weightlifters at the 2014 Commonwealth Games
Commonwealth Games competitors for Kiribati